Dupray is a surname. Notable people with the surname include:

Gaston Dupray (1886–1976), Belgian film actor
Gilles Dupray (born 1970), French athlete
Jordan Dupray (born 1991), French-Malagasy footballer
Micheline Dupray (born 1927), French poet

See also
Duprat